Andrea Tarozzi (born 17 October 1973) is an Italian former footballer, who played as a defender, and currently the assistant manager of Parma.

Playing career
After making his Serie A debut in the 1996–97 season, in July 1997 he joined Fiorentina for 6.5 billion Italian lire, while Daniele Carnasciali moved to opposite direction, for 1.75 billion lire.

Following Fiorentina's bankruptcy, Tarozzi became a free agent.

Coaching career
In 2011, he passed his category 2 coaching exam, made him eligible to coach Lega Pro teams.

References

External links
 

1973 births
ACF Fiorentina players
association football defenders
Bologna F.C. 1909 players
Calcio Padova players
Como 1907 players
Italian footballers
living people
people from San Giovanni in Persiceto
Serie A players
Serie B players
Serie C players
Ternana Calcio players
U.S. Sassuolo Calcio players
Footballers from Emilia-Romagna
Sportspeople from the Metropolitan City of Bologna